

Career leaders
Bold denotes still active with team

Italics denote still active but not with team

These lists are accurate through the 2021 regular season.

Passing leaders

Rushing leaders

Receiving leaders

References

American football team records and statistics
records